Nicholas William "Nick" Taylor (November 17, 1927 – October 3, 2020) was a geologist, businessman and politician from Alberta, Canada.

Early life
Nicholas William Taylor was born November 17, 1927, in Bow Island, Alberta to Marie Louise Ancion and Frederick David Taylor, and was the eldest of five children. Taylor traveled to Medicine Hat for High School, and attended the University of Alberta completing his studies in geology and mining engineering in 1949. Later that year Taylor married Margaret Davies on October 1 and together had nine children.

Taylor worked as a geologist in the petroleum industry in Alberta during the 1950s and later started his own company Lochiel Exploration Ltd. in 1960. Lochiel Exploration would prove to be successful, branching out to several countries until it entered receivership in 1986 following the downturn in oil markets.

Political career
Taylor started his political career by running in the 1968 and 1972 federal elections in Calgary Centre as a member of the Liberal Party of Canada.  He was defeated both times.

Taylor served as leader of the Alberta Liberal Party from 1974 to 1988. Taylor defeated his opponent for Liberal leadership John Borger, a former Center for the  Calgary Stampeders and PhD in biochemistry. At the beginning of his leadership, the party was at its lowest point in history, where the last Liberal to serve in the Alberta Legislative Assembly, Bill Dickie of Calgary Glenmore, had crossed the floor to the Progressive Conservatives in 1969. During his time as Liberal leader, Taylor who was independently wealthy from the success of his oil exploration company Lochiel, donated significant sums to the party to keep it viable, with the Globe and Mail estimating the total above $100,000. Taylor was defeated at the 1988 Liberal Convention by Edmonton Mayor Laurence Decore, garnering only 18 percent support. Under Taylor's leadership the Alberta Liberal Party would split from the Liberal Party of Canada in 1976, after the Alberta Liberals received no funding from the federal party for the 1975 Alberta general election, with the federal wing instead supporting the Social Credit Party of Alberta in exchange for support in Parliament.

Taylor slowly rebuilt the party in the face of the federal Liberal government's unpopularity in Alberta and its implementation of such programs as the National Energy Program. In the 1986 Alberta general election, the Liberals made a breakthrough by winning four seats. Taylor himself was elected by over 500 votes in the newly created northern Alberta riding of Westlock-Sturgeon; he was re-elected there in 1989. In 1993, Taylor was elected by 1700 votes in the newly created riding of Redwater against incumbent PC MLA Steve Zarusky.

During his time in the Alberta Legislature, Taylor was known for his wit and banter with government members. On May 13, 1991, Taylor was ejected from the Legislature by Speaker David J. Carter for unparliamentary language following a resolution to congratulate Baltej Singh Dhillon, the first RCMP officer to wear a turban, was defeated. Taylor yelled "shame" at the government and called Speaker Carter "one of the crappiest speakers [I've] ever seen". Taylor apologized the next day. His banter led to two Premiers issuing "no-laugh" orders to their caucuses when Taylor would speak negatively about the Progressive Conservative government or Ministers.

Taylor was appointed to the Senate of Canada by Jean Chrétien in 1996 and served there until 2002, choosing Bon Accord and Sturgeon as his Senatorial constituency. Taylor was appointed to replace Bud Olson who was appointed as the 14th Lieutenant Governor of Alberta. Following his appointment, Taylor acknowledged his appointment as patronage following criticism from prominent Reform Party Albertans. Future Prime Minister and Member of Parliament Stephen Harper criticized the appointment, stating "Mr. Taylor's only real qualification to the Senate is that he was Liberal leader and had the audacity to continue to be Liberal leader during the period of the National Energy Program".

Later life
Following his mandatory retirement from the Senate at the age of 75, Taylor retired from politics. In 2019, Taylor testified before the Senate Standing Committee on Energy, the Environment and Natural Resources in defence of Bill C-69, which amended the regulatory review process for energy projects.

Taylor died in Peter Lougheed Hospital in Calgary on October 3, 2020, at the age of 92.

Electoral record

Federal elections

Provincial elections

|}

References

External links
 
Democracy Watch on the Canadian Senate
Nicholas Taylor's obituary

1927 births
2020 deaths
Leaders of the Alberta Liberal Party
Alberta Liberal Party MLAs
Canadian senators from Alberta
Liberal Party of Canada senators
Candidates in the 1968 Canadian federal election
Candidates in the 1972 Canadian federal election
People from the County of Forty Mile No. 8
21st-century Canadian politicians
Liberal Party of Canada candidates for the Canadian House of Commons